Zerogone is a monotypic genus of Russian sheet weavers containing the single species, Zerogone submissella. It was first described by K. Y. Eskov & Y. M. Marusik in 1994, and is only found in Russia.

See also
 List of Linyphiidae species (Q–Z)

References

Linyphiidae
Monotypic Araneomorphae genera
Spiders of Russia